The 1995 World Women's Handball Championship took place in Austria and Hungary 5–17 December 1995. It was the only to have 20 teams and the first to have multiple hosts. South Korea won its first title in Vienna.

Squads

Group stage

Group A

Group B

Group C

Group D

Cross matches 
The 4th and 5th place from A met 5th and 4th from B and the same for group C and D. The winner of each match got a place in the round of 16.

Knockout stage

Round of 16

Placement 5–12 
Losers from round of 16 played for placements from 9 to 12. Losers from quarterfinals played for places 5 to 8. There was no play for lower rankings.

9–12

5–8

Final standings

All Star Team 
 Goalkeeper: Cecilie Leganger 
 Left Wing: Anette Hoffmann 
 Left Back: Lim O-kyeong 
 Center Back: Mariana Tîrcă 
 Pivot: Natalia Deriougina 
 Right Back: Sorina Lefter 
 Right Wing: Katalin Szilágyi

References 
 Source: International Handball Federation
 Full Data on the Hungarian Wiki: 1995-ös női kézilabda-világbajnokság

World Handball Championship tournaments
World Women's Handball Championship, 1995
World Women's Handball Championship, 1995
W
W
Women's handball in Austria
Women's handball in Hungary
World Women's Handball Championship
World Women's Handball Championship